Mascelia is a monotypic snout moth genus described by George Hampson in 1930. Its only species, Mascelia ectophoea, was described by the same author in 1908. It is found in Sri Lanka and in India.

This species has a wingspan of 18 mm.

References

Moths described in 1908
Phycitinae
Monotypic moth genera
Moths of Asia